Candraprabha (lit. 'Moonlight', Chinese: 月光菩薩; pinyin: Yuèguāng Púsà; Rōmaji: Gakkō or Gekkō Bosatsu) is a bodhisattva often seen with Sūryaprabha, as the two siblings serve Bhaiṣajyaguru. Statues of Candraprabha and Sūryaprabha closely resemble each other and are commonly found together, sometimes flanking temple doors. They are also recognized in mainland Asia as devas.

See also 
 Index of Buddhism-related articles
 Secular Buddhism

References 

Bodhisattvas
Bhaiṣajyaguru Buddha
Twenty-Four Protective Deities
Lunar gods